The 1896 Auburn Tigers football team represented Auburn University in the 1896 Southern Intercollegiate Athletic Association football season. It was the Tigers' fifth season. The team was led by head coach John Heisman, in his second year, and finished with a record of three wins and one loss (3–1 overall, 3–1 in the SIAA). The team's captain was Reynolds Tichenor.

The Georgia–Auburn game was a 12 to 6 victory by Georgia to finish its first undefeated season under Pop Warner. The game featured Tichenor's brilliant punt returns.

Schedule

References

Auburn
Auburn Tigers football seasons
Auburn Tigers football